Change of Mind is a 1969 science fiction/drama film starring Raymond St. Jacques, Susan Oliver, Janet MacLachlan, and Leslie Nielsen.

Plot

A married couple struggles to adjust when the husband, dying of cancer, has his brain transplanted into the body of a black man.

David Rowe (St. Jacques) is a white district attorney who must now live his life as a black man. His wife Margaret (Oliver) tries to deal with the transformation of her husband's appearance as David feels the stings of racial prejudice for the first time. She has trouble being intimate with the man she knows is still her husband.

Racist Sheriff Webb (Nielsen) is a local lawman who resents the district attorney, but after the sheriff is accused of killing his own black mistress, he must rely on David for his legal defense.  Rowe investigates the murder of the young black woman while dealing with his superiors, friends and family treating him differently.

During his investigation, David has to deal with the moral quandary of releasing evidence that clears the Sheriff, knowing it will allow the Sheriff to continue to abuse minorities.

Cast
Raymond St. Jacques as David Rowe
Susan Oliver as Margaret Rowe
Janet MacLachlan as Elizabeth
Leslie Nielsen as Sheriff Webb
Donnelly Rhodes as Roger Morrow
David Bailey as Tommy Benson
Andre Womble as Scupper
Clarice Taylor as Rose Landis
Jack Creley as Bill Chambers
Cosette Lee as Angela Rowe
Larry Reynolds as Judge Forrest
Hope Clarke as Nancy
Rudy Challenger as Howard Culver
Henry Ramer as Chief Enfield 
Joseph Shaw as Gov. LaTourette

Production
The film was shot in Toronto.

Reception

TV Guide found that the movie was gimmicky giving it one out of four stars. It did like the Duke Ellington soundtrack. Roger Ebert gave the movie 2.5 stars, stating that it tended to focus on the trial aspects of the movie rather than the main character's reaction to now being a black man. Ebert was pleased with the acting in the movie. In a review by Roger Greenspun of The New York Times it was found the movie failed to address any of the questions it was raising, and found the "pedestrian, sometimes conventionally audacious, direction " to be a hindrance. It did however praise the acting of St. Jacques and MacLachlan. The Encyclopedia of Science Fiction found the movie to be a rare treatment of racial issues in a science fiction film, nd that while the movie mostly succeeds, it did contain many crass lines of dialogue.

Novelization

A novelization of the movie was released in 1969 written by Chris Stratton.

See also
 List of American films of 1969

References

External links
 
 

1969 films
1960s science fiction drama films
American science fiction drama films
Films about brain transplants
Cinerama Releasing Corporation films
Films about racism
Films directed by Robert Stevens
Films scored by Duke Ellington
1969 drama films
1960s English-language films
1960s American films